The women's 30 kilometre freestyle competition in cross-country skiing at the 2022 Winter Olympics was held on 20 February, at the Kuyangshu Nordic Center and Biathlon Center in Zhangjiakou. Therese Johaug of Norway became the champion, thereby winning all three individual distance events at these Olympics. She was only second woman to do so after Marja-Liisa Kirvesniemi in 1984. Jessie Diggins of the United States won the silver medal, and Kerttu Niskanen of Finland the bronze. For Diggins, this was her first individual Olympic medal.

The day before the race, the start time was moved to 11:00 local time due to adverse weather conditions.

Summary
The 30 km distance event alternates between classical style and free style skiing in succeeding Olympics, and in 2022 it was the free style event. The 2014 and 2018 champion, Marit Bjørgen, retired from competitions. The silver medalist, Krista Pärmäkoski, qualified for the Olympics, and the bronze medalist, Stina Nilsson, switched to biathlon. The overall leader of the 2021–22 FIS Cross-Country World Cup before the Olympics was Natalya Nepryayeva, and the distance leader was Frida Karlsson. Johaug was the 2021 world champion in the 30 km classical.

Qualification

Results

References

Women's cross-country skiing at the 2022 Winter Olympics